"Just Between You and Me" is a song co-written and recorded by American country music duo The Kinleys.  It was released in December 1997 as the second single and title track from the album Just Between You and Me.  The song reached number 12 on the Billboard Hot Country Singles & Tracks chart.  The song was written by Heather Kinley, Jennifer Kinley, Russ Zavitson, and Debbie Zavitson.

Chart performance

Year-end charts

References

1998 singles
1997 songs
The Kinleys songs
Epic Records singles